Groblje may refer to: 

In Serbia:
Novo groblje, Belgrade, a cemetery complex
Staro Groblje, a neighborhood of Niš

In Slovenia:
Groblje, a hamlet of Buče, Kozje in the Municipality of Kozje
Groblje, a hamlet of Dekmanca in the Municipality of Bistrica ob Sotli
Groblje, a hamlet of Rodica, Domžale in the Municipality of Domžale
Groblje pri Prekopi, a settlement in the Municipality of Šentjernej